The London Thornton Manuscript is a medieval manuscript compiled and copied by the fifteenth-century English scribe and landowner Robert Thornton. The manuscript was long considered a miscellany, but is more properly called a collection of spiritual texts.

Contents
Wynnere and Wastoure (unique)
The Parlement of the  Ages (only complete copy)
The Sege of Melayne (unique)
The Four Leaves of the Truelove (one of two extant copies)
Rowland and Otuel
"Have Mercy of Me" (Psalm 51)
alliterative rendering of Psalm 51. Since at least two leaves are missing, translation breaks off after l. 134; a complete version would have had more than 240 lines.
The Virtues of the Mass

References
Notes

Bibliography

15th-century books
15th-century manuscripts
Middle English literature
15th century in England
Lincoln Cathedral